Major Lazer Essentials is a compilation album released by American electronic dance music trio Major Lazer. It was initially released on October 19, 2018 through the groups record label Mad Decent Records. It includes the singles "Cold Water", "Run Up", "All My Life", "Orkant/Balance Pon It", "Tied Up", "Loyal" and "Blow That Smoke".

Track listing

Charts

Weekly charts

Year-end charts

Certifications

References

Major Lazer albums
2018 compilation albums
Mad Decent albums
Albums produced by Diplo
Albums produced by Stargate
Albums produced by Benny Blanco
Albums produced by Switch (songwriter)
Albums produced by Willie Colón
Albums produced by Jake Gosling